Hymenochirus curtipes, also known as western dwarf clawed frog, is a species of frog in the family Pipidae. It is found in western Democratic Republic of the Congo and adjacent Republic of the Congo. It is likely to occur in the southernmost Central African Republic.

Description
Females can reach at least  in snout–vent length. The head is narrow and flat, and the eyes point almost directly upward. No tympanum is visible. The legs are short compared to other Hymenochirus. The fingers are half-webbed, whereas the toes are completely webbed, with the webbing scarcely indented. Skin is coarsely and uniformly tubercular. The body is muddy brown above with indistinct dark brown spotting that becomes distinct below.

Habitat and conservation
Hymenochirus curtipes is presumably ecologically similar to Hymenochirus boettgeri, an aquatic frog that occurs in still, shaded water in lowland rainforest, and in pools by slow-flowing rivers. Two individuals in amplexus have been reported in a flooded forest. No significant threats to this species are known; although it is collected for pet trade, this is not considered a threat.

As pets
Hymenochirus curtipes are kept as pets. Former London mayor Ken Livingstone was the first person in the world to breed H. curtipes in captivity.

References

curtipes
Frogs of Africa
Amphibians of the Democratic Republic of the Congo
Amphibians of the Republic of the Congo
Amphibians described in 1924
Taxa named by Gladwyn Kingsley Noble
Taxonomy articles created by Polbot